Pedinocera is a genus of flies in the family Stratiomyidae.

Distribution
Peru.

Species
Pedinocera longicornis Kertész, 1909

References

Stratiomyidae
Brachycera genera
Taxa named by Kálmán Kertész
Diptera of South America
Endemic fauna of Peru